Lajos Őze (27 April 1935 – 21 October 1984) was a Hungarian actor. He appeared in over 80 films between 1955 and 1984. He starred in the 1976 film The Fifth Seal, which was entered into the 27th Berlin International Film Festival.

Selected filmography
 A Glass of Beer (1955)
 Two Confessions (1957)
 The Round-Up (1965)
 Twenty Hours (1965)
 The Witness (1969)
 The Upthrown Stone (1969)
 The Fifth Seal (1976)
 Macbeth (1982)
 Flowers of Reverie (1985)

References

External links

1935 births
1984 deaths
Deaths from lung cancer
Deaths from cancer in Hungary
Hungarian male film actors
People from Szentes
20th-century Hungarian male actors